Daniil Sergeyevich Tyumentsev (born 14 February 1997) is a Russian football player. He plays for FC Chertanovo Moscow.

Club career
He made his professional debut in the Russian Professional Football League for FC Chertanovo Moscow on 25 July 2014 in a game against FC Tambov. He made his Russian Football National League debut for Chertanovo on 17 July 2018 in a game against FC Rotor Volgograd.

References

External links
 Career summary by sportbox.ru

1997 births
Living people
Russian footballers
Association football midfielders
FC Chertanovo Moscow players
Russian First League players
Russian Second League players